SAM domain, SH3 domain and nuclear localization signals 1 is a protein that in humans is encoded by the SAMSN1 gene.

Function

SAMSN1 is a member of a novel gene family of putative adaptors and scaffold proteins containing SH3 and SAM (sterile alpha motif) domains (Claudio et al., 2001 [PubMed 11536050]).

References

Further reading